The IUPUI Jaguars men's basketball team is the men's basketball team that represents Indiana University–Purdue University Indianapolis in Indianapolis, Indiana, United States. The school's team currently competes in the Horizon League.

History
The first year of IUPUI basketball was 1971–72 and the school competed as an NCAA Division III Independent. From 1982 to 2014, the Jaguars played on campus at The Jungle, which seated 1,215. Beginning with the 2014–15 season, the Jaguars play their home games at the Indiana Farmers Coliseum on the State Fairgrounds. Prior to the Jaguars' move, the arena underwent a $63 million renovation to modernize it for the fair and for basketball. The renovated arena has capacity for 6,800.

The Jaguars are currently led by head coach Matt Crenshaw. The Jaguars joined the Horizon League on July 1, 2017, replacing Valparaiso, which left the conference on the same day.

Conference affiliations

Postseason

NCAA tournament results
The Jaguars have appeared in one NCAA tournament. Their record is 0–1.

NAIA Tournament results
The Jaguars have appeared in the NAIA Tournament two times. Their record is 1–2.

CBI results
The Jaguars have appeared in one College Basketball Invitational (CBI). Their record is 1–1.

CIT Results
The Jaguars have appeared in the CollegeInsider.com Postseason Tournament (CIT) one time. Their record is 0–1.

Record year-by-year

 IUPUI joined NCAA Division I beginning in the 1998–99 season. Non-Division I seasons are not included.
 IUPUI vacated the records of eight conference games in 2003–04, nine games in 2004–05, and seven games in 2006–07 as a result of NCAA sanctions. The Summit League also sanctioned IUPUI one conference game in 2008–09. Vacated games are included in this table.

Notable players 
In 2008, guard George Hill skipped his final year of eligibility and entered the NBA draft where he was selected by the San Antonio Spurs, becoming the first player drafted from IUPUI.

References

External links